Raven Klaasen and Marcelo Melo were the defending champions, but Melo chose to play in Beijing instead.

Klaasen played alongside Rajeev Ram, but lost in the final to Marcel Granollers and Marcin Matkowski, 2–6, .

Seeds

Draw

Draw

Qualifying

Seeds

Qualifiers
  Nicholas Monroe /  Artem Sitak

Qualifying draw

References
Main Draw
Qualifying Draw

Rakuten Japan Open Tennis Championships Doubles